St. Hilda's Church may refer to:
 St Hilda's Church, Bilsborrow, Lancashire, England
 St Hilda's Church, Griffithstown, Torfaen, Wales
 St Hilda's Church, Hartlepool, County Durham, England
 St Hilda's Church, South Shields, Tyne and Wear, England
 St. Hilda's Church, Singapore, Joo Chiat, Singapore

See also
St. Hilda's (disambiguation)